The Osage script is a new script promulgated in 2006 and revised 2012–2014 for the Osage language. Because Latin orthographies were subject to interference from English conventions among Osage students who were more familiar with English than with Osage, in 2006 the director of the Osage Language Program, Herman Mongrain Lookout, decided to create a distinct script by modifying or fusing Latin letters. This Osage script has been in regular use on the Osage Nation ever since.

In 2012, while in the process of submitting the script to Unicode, a more precise representation of the sounds of Osage was formulated, and by the following year had been adequately tested. In February 2014, a conference on standardizing the reforms was held by Lookout and the staff at the Osage Nation Language Department along with UCS expert Michael Everson. The result included the introduction of case, the abolition of two ligatures and the addition of several derived characters for sounds that varied between dialects.

The Osage script was included in Unicode version 9.0 in June 2016 in the Osage block.

Letters

Vowels 
The 2014 vowel letters are as follows:

Long vowels are indicated with a macron, high tone by an acute accent, and a long vowel with high tone by a double acute accent: e.g. oral  Ā ā,  Á á,  Ā́ ā́, nasal  Ą̄ ą̄,  Ą́ ą́,  Ą̄́ ą̄́.

It is not clear how Ə is used, as it is not phonemic in Osage.

The a comes from Latin  (without the crossbar, as in the NASA "worm" logo), e from Latin cursive  (the 'long' sound of the English letter a is rather like Osage e). The source for i is obscure, though Latin  does appear inside  in the diphthong ai.

Consonants 
The 2014 consonant letters and digraphs are as follows. As in Latin orthography, the ejective consonants are written with a diacritic, and the strongly aspirated stops with digraphs. The pre-aspirated stops were originally written as digraphs with h, but since they vary by dialect with geminates, the 2014 revision included new letters for them derived by adding a cross-bar.

Px and pš are allophones, as are kx ~ kš and tx ~ ch (tsh). Hy and ky are sequences rather than single consonants.

W is a partial . X might be from cursive ; h is obscure.

Punctuation
Words are separated by a space. Syllables were originally separated by a full stop, but that practice has ceased with increasing literacy.

Further applications
There are considerations for the script to be usable for other languages in the same Dhegiha group even as far as within the Siouan family.

Unicode

The Osage alphabet was added to the Unicode Standard in June, 2016 with the release of version 9.0.

The Unicode block for Osage is U+104B0–U+104FF:

References

External links
 2014 Language Presentation at Osage Nation, includes non-native sound files for some letters
 Presentation at Native-languages.org, along with various romanizations
 
 Interview with Herman Mongrain Lookout on invention of the script on Invisible Nations, KOSU

Osage Nation
Alphabets
Writing systems of the Americas
Writing systems introduced in 2006
Western Siouan languages